Maria Walliser (born 27 May 1963) is a Swiss former alpine skier.

Career
Walliser grew up in Mosnang, the daughter of a wealthy cattle breeder. She made her World Cup debut in 1980. Together with her fellow Swiss Erika Hess, Michela Figini and Vreni Schneider she dominated female alpine skiing during the 1980s. Among her many successes, she won two overall World Cups (1986 and 1987). Walliser also won three world titles in 1987 and 1989, as well as three Olympic medals at 1988 Calgary and 1984 Sarajevo.

Walliser retired in 1990 with a World Cup tally of 72 podium finishes, including 25 victories. In 2000, she became president of "Die Stiftung Folsäure Offensive Schweiz", a Swiss health organization fighting folate deficiency.

World Cup results

Season titles
 7 titles – (2 Overall, 2 DH, 1 GS, 1 AC, 1 SG)

Season standings

Race victories
25 race victories (14 downhill, 3 super G, 6 giant slalom, 2 combined)

World Championships results

Olympic results

See also
List of FIS Alpine Ski World Cup women's race winners

References

External links
 
 

1963 births
Living people
Swiss female alpine skiers
Alpine skiers at the 1984 Winter Olympics
Alpine skiers at the 1988 Winter Olympics
Olympic alpine skiers of Switzerland
Olympic silver medalists for Switzerland
Olympic bronze medalists for Switzerland
Olympic medalists in alpine skiing
FIS Alpine Ski World Cup champions
Medalists at the 1984 Winter Olympics
Medalists at the 1988 Winter Olympics
20th-century Swiss women